Per "Pelle" Anders Håkan Åsling (born 12 February 1957 in Alsen, Jämtland) is a Swedish politician of the Centre Party. He has been a member of the Riksdag since 2006.

External links 
Riksdagen: Per Åsling (c)

Members of the Riksdag 2010–2014
Living people
1957 births
Members of the Riksdag 2006–2010
Members of the Riksdag 2014–2018
Members of the Riksdag 2018–2022
Members of the Riksdag from the Centre Party (Sweden)
21st-century Swedish politicians